Ernesto Nathan Rogers (March 16, 1909 – November 7, 1969) was an Italian architect, writer and educator.

Biography
Born in Trieste, then in the Austro-Hungarian Empire, he graduated from the Politecnico di Milano, Italy in 1932. He is the cousin of the renowned English-Italian architect Richard Rogers.

BBPR Group
Rogers, together with Gian Luigi Banfi, Ludovico Belgiojoso and Enrico Peressutti, in 1932 formed an architectural partnership in Milan, Italy named BBPR (from the names of the architects).

As a partner of BBPR, Rogers completed several projects. Perhaps his best-known work is the Torre Velasca (Velasca Tower), located in the historic city centre of Milan.

In the period between the two World Wars an account of his activities virtually coincides with the engagements of BBPR as a whole.

Editor and journalist
In the post-war period Rogers distinguished himself from his partners through his work as journalist, critic and architectural publicist.

Associated with art and architecture periodicals from his student days, in fact, he co-edited Quadrante from 1933 to 1936, and as a prolific writer, as well as architect, he was instrumental in the establishment of Italian rationalism (it: razionalismo).

From 1953 until 1965 he had the direction of the magazine Casabella.

War years
During his internment in Switzerland (1943–45) he maintained his interest in journalism as well as being active in the anti-fascist Partito d’Azione.

Post war cultural debate
On his return to Milan, he took on Domus as publisher–editor (1946–47), developing its international reputation as an architectural periodical. Rogers’s major contribution to European architectural polemic, and the Italian neo-liberty debate in particular, was through his editorship of Casabella in the key period 1953 to 1964.

Dal cucchiaio alla città ("From the spoon to the town") is the slogan created by Ernesto Rogers in 1952 in the Athens Charter. He explained the typical approach of a Milanese architect, designing a spoon, a chair, and a lamp and in the same day working on a skyscraper.

The group of architects including Aldo Rossi, Vittorio Gregotti and Giancarlo de Carlo, with whom he conducted the debate through Casabella columns, and through artefacts and writings, continued to influence Western architecture.

Rogers played a vital role in the transition from post-war Rationalism to acceptance of historical context as a major determinant of style.

University career
Rogers lectured and taught widely, becoming a lecturer at the Politecnico di Milano from 1962 and a professor in 1964.

1909 births
1969 deaths
Architects from Trieste
Italian male journalists
Polytechnic University of Milan alumni
Academic staff of the Polytechnic University of Milan
20th-century Italian architects
Casabella editors
Italian people of English descent
Rogers family
Compasso d'Oro Award recipients
Domus (magazine) editors